Paige Summers (born Nancy Ann Coursey) was an American adult model. She was a former Penthouse Pet of the Month and Pet of the Year. She moved with her family to Morganton, North Carolina and graduated from Freedom High School where her senior superlative was "Barbie Look-Alike".

Career
She invented the name Paige Summers for her adult modeling career. She appeared in several issues of High Society and Cheri magazines in 1995, and was first chosen Penthouse Pet of the Month for August 1996, but her fame came as Penthouse Pet of the Year for 1998 where she became the first North Carolinian to be so chosen. Kia Motors gave her a Sportage SUV as part of her award, in exchange for advertising. She claimed to earn half a million dollars a year. Summers appeared on The Howard Stern Show and several Penthouse videos.

Personal life
Coursey traveled as part of her career, visiting India and Australia. In 2003, she moved in with her family in Morganton. She was engaged to be married to local pharmacist and real estate owner Bracey Bobbitt on October 11, 2003. She was found dead in her home on the shore of Lake James the morning of September 22 of a drug overdose from a combination of the painkillers codeine and oxycodone.

Coursey is buried at the Mountain Grove United Methodist Church Cemetery in Morganton.

See also 
 List of Penthouse Pets of the Year

References

1976 births
2003 deaths
American female adult models
Penthouse Pets of the Year
People from Lorain, Ohio
Drug-related deaths in North Carolina
Penthouse Pets
Pornographic film actors from Ohio
Pornographic film actors from North Carolina
People from Morganton, North Carolina
20th-century American women
21st-century American women